"Whatcha See Is Whatcha Get" is a 1971 single written and produced by Tony Hester and performed by The Dramatics.

Song Background
The song is noted for its scatting by the lead singer Ron Banks, and for the bass singer, Willie Ford, saying "Look at me."  The song was co-led by William "Wee Gee" Howard and Banks, with other lead parts shared by the other members, Larry "Squirrel" Demps and Elbert Wilkins.

Chart performance
The song was a #3 hit on the Billboard R&B charts, and broke into the Top 10 of the Billboard Hot 100, peaking at #9.  In Canada, it reached #44.

Cover versions
The song has been covered by British pop group The Beautiful South on their 1990 album Choke
American singer and drag queen RuPaul  covered it on the 1993 soundtrack album Addams Family Values: Music from the Motion Picture
The American experimental rock band When People Were Shorter and Lived Near the Water covered it on their 1994 album Bill Kennedy's Showtime
Duo Hall & Oates included it on their 2004 album Our Kind of Soul
Gerald Albright included it, as an instrumental, on his 2008 CD "Sax For Stax" as "What You See Is What You Get".

Later uses
"Whatcha See Is Whatcha Get" is featured in Mel Stuart's 1973 documentary film "Wattstax". This film chronicles the historic 1972 Wattstax concert at the Los Angeles Memorial Coliseum in which the Dramatics performed this song among a legendary lineup of R&B, Soul, Pop, and gospel artists.
The Dramatics performed "Whatcha See Is Whatcha Get" in the racially charged and raunchy "Darktown Strutters", a blaxploitation comedy film produced by Gene Corman in 1975.
In 2007 "Whatcha See Is Whatcha Get" was included in the soundtrack for the American '60s/'70s period film "Talk To Me", starring Don Cheadle.  
The song was featured in the second season of the FX series Fargo, in the episode "The Gift of the Magi". It also features in the closing credits of the James Randi documentary, An Honest Liar (2014).

Samples
It was sampled by hip-hop trio Injury Reserve on "Yo," the opening track of their 2015 album Live from the Dentist Office. and on "Big Daddy Kane vs. Dolemite" (1990) by Big Daddy Kane and Rudy Ray Moore.

References

External links
 
 
 
The Dramatics IMDB webpage    https://www.imdb.com/name/nm2182032/
PBS POV website on "Wattstax"  https://www.pbs.org/pov/watch/wattstax/

1971 songs
1971 singles
The Dramatics songs
Stax Records singles